SeaDoc Society is a nonprofit marine science organization based on Orcas Island, Washington. They work to ensure the health of marine wildlife and their ecosystems through science and education. SeaDoc Society is a program of the Karen C. Drayer Wildlife Health Center at the UC Davis School of Veterinary Medicine.

They fund and conduct research and produce a wildlife web series called Salish Sea Wild and a podcast called Pod of Orcas. Their work has also lead to community outreach including plans to address oil spills and its effects on marine life.

References 

Salish Sea
University of California, Davis
Non-profit organizations based in Washington (state)